Benjamin or Ben Campbell may refer to:

 Ben Nighthorse Campbell, former U.S. Senator from Colorado
 Ben Campbell (musician) (New Zealand), bassist for rock bands Atlas and Zed
 Benjamin Campbell, founder of Campbell, California
 Ben Campbell, an ice hockey player for the Guildford Flames
 Benedict Campbell (born 1957), known as Ben, voice actor
 Ben Campbell, a character in the 2008 film 21
 Ben Campbell (golfer), Scottish professional golfer who played in the late 19th century
 Benjamin Campbell (consular agent) (died 1859), British merchant and consular agent